Viking Bus Station is a bus station in Lerwick, Shetland, Scotland. The station is used both by passengers and for freight, which is transported by bus.

History
While the site had been in use as a bus station for some time prior, plans for a new station building were put forward by the council in 1985. Construction work began in March 1990, with the work carried out by Shetland-based construction firm DITT. The bus station opened on 22 May 1991, representing an overall investment of approximately £900,000.

A mural was installed at the bus station in 2007 to celebrate the opening of the Shetland Museum. In 2018, it was replaced with a new spray-painted mural.

In 2013, Shetland Islands Council proposed closing the waiting room and relocating the freight operations, which it expected would save £80,000 per year. Instead, ownership of the bus station was transferred to the private sector. In 2014, ownership of the station was transferred to a couple who operate a Chinese restaurant on its upper floor.

See also
List of bus stations in Scotland

References

Transport in Shetland
Bus stations in Scotland
Lerwick